The Giske Wetlands System is a Ramsar site located in the municipality of Giske in Møre og Romsdal county, Norway. It consists of six separate protected areas: two nature reserves and four wildlife sanctuaries. One of the nature reserves lies on the island of Giske and the five other areas are located on the island of Vigra in the same municipality.

The areas have been protected as a Ramsar site since 1996 because of their importance for migratory birds. There are large shallow areas with mudflats exposed during low tide. A lot of seaweed (Fucales and kelp) accumulates there, providing good conditions for birds in search of food. There are also marshes, damp beach meadows, and swamps in the wetland system.

The six areas are: 
 The Roaldsand Wildlife Sanctuary, established on May 27, 1988
 The Rørvikvågen Wildlife Sanctuary, established on May 27, 1988 
 The Rørvikvatnet Nature Reserve, established on May 27, 1988
 The Giske Wildlife Sanctuary, established on May 27, 1988
 The Blindheimsvik Wildlife Sanctuary, established on May 27, 1988
 The Synesvågen Nature Reserve, established on May 27, 1988

References

Nature reserves in Norway
Ramsar sites in Norway
Protected areas of Møre og Romsdal
Giske
Protected areas established in 1996